Waikato Tainui, Waikato or Tainui is a group of Māori iwi based in Waikato Region, in the western central region of New Zealand's North Island. It is part of the larger Tainui confederation of Polynesian settlers who arrived to New Zealand on the Tainui waka (migration canoe). The tribe is named after the Waikato River, which plays a large part in its history and culture.

Pōtatau Te Wherowhero, the first Māori king, was a member of the Waikato hapu (sub-tribe) of Ngāti Mahuta, and his descendants have succeeded him. The king movement is based at Tūrangawaewae marae (meeting place) in Ngāruawāhia.

The Waikato-Tainui iwi comprises 33 hapū (sub-tribes) and 68 marae (family groupings), with around an estimated population of 84,030 tribal members who affiliate to Waikato-Tainui. Hamilton City is now the tribe's largest population centre, but Ngāruawāhia remains the tribe's historical centre and modern capital.

This is how the iwi describes its origins and tribal area:

Government 
Waikato-Tainui's governing parliamentary body is Te Kauhanganui, a governing body of 204 tribal members – 3 members from each of the 68 marae. The marae are spread over a large area from Te Kuiti and Cambridge in the south to Auckland in the north.

The executive board is Te Arataura, which has 10 representatives elected from Te Kauhanganui and an 11th member appointed by the Māori king. The Waikato-Tainui tribal administration (or iwi authority) is the Waikato Raupatu Trustee Company Ltd, which replaced the Tainui Māori Trust Board, and is situated at Hopuhopu, Ngāruawāhia.

The Waikato iwi has been using the name Tainui to describe itself for some time, through the establishment of the Tainui Māori Trust Board by the Waikato-Maniapoto Maori Claims Settlement Act 1946, with many people now referring to the Waikato iwi as "Tainui" or "Waikato-Tainui".

There have traditionally been strong links between Tainui and the University of Waikato, which has strengths in Māori language and modern local history. The university also holds documents and objects related to the tribe.

Hapū and marae
Waikato Tainui is made up of several iwi (tribes) and hapū (sub-tribes).

Each tribal group has marae (meeting grounds), which usually includes a wharenui'' (meeting house).

Ngāti Mahuta
The iwi of Ngāti Mahuta is associated with 20 marae:

 1 in Māngere Bridge: Te Puea Memorial Marae
 3 near Te Kauwhata: Ōkarea marae, Taniwha marae and Matahuru Papakainga marae
 1 in Rangiriri: Horahora marae 
 4 in and around Huntly: Te Ōhākī marae, Kaitumutumu marae, Te Kauri marae and Waahi marae 
 3 in and around Ngāruawāhia: Taupiri marae, Waikeri–Tangirau marae, and Tūrangawaewae marae
 1 near Te Awamutu: Te Kōpua marae
 3 around Aotea Harbour: Mōtakotako (Taruke) marae, Te Papatapu (Te Wehi) marae and Te Tihi o Moerangi marae
 4 around Kawhia Harbour: Maketū marae, Ōkapu marae, Āruka marae and Te Kōraha marae

Ngāti Te Wehi
The iwi of Ngāti Te Wehi is associated with 11 marae:

 4 marae around Aotea Harbour: Ookapu marae, Mōtakotako (Taruke) marae, Te Papatapu (Te Wehi) marae and Te Tihi o Moerangi marae
 5 marae around Kawhia Harbour:Raakaunui marae, Waipapa marae, Maketū marae, Āruka marae and Te Kōraha marae
 2 marae in Ngāruawāhia: Tūrangawaewae marae and Waikeri – Tangirau marae

Ngāti Kuiaarangi, Ngāti Tai and Ngāti Whāwhākia
The hapū of Ngāti Tai, Ngāti Kuiaarangi and Ngāti Whāwhākia are associated with 8 marae:

 4 marae in and around Huntly: Kaitumutumu marae, Te Kauri marae, Waahi marae and Te Ōhākī marae
 2 marae near Te Kauwhata: Ōkarea marae and Taniwha marea in Waeranga
 1 marae in Māngere Bridge: Te Puea Memorial Marae
 1 marae in Taupiri: Taupiri marae

Tainui
The hapū of Tainui is associated with 7 marae:

 4 marae east of Huntly: Te Ākau marae, Pukerewa marae, Te Poho o Tanikena marae and Weraroa marae
 2 marae around Raglan Harbour: Poihākena marae and Te Kōpua marae
 1 marae around Aotea Harbour: Mōtakotako (Taruke) marae

Ngāti Tāhinga
The hapū of Ngāti Tāhinga is associated with 6 marae:

 2 marae in Port Waikato: Ngāti Tāhinga marae and Pakau marae
 4 marae west of Huntly: Pukerewa, Te Ākau, Te Poho o Tanikena and Weraroa

Ngāti Apakura
The hapū of Ngāti Apakura is associated with 6 marae:

 3 marae around Pirongia: Pūrekireki marae, Hīona marae and Te Kōpua
 1 marae in Ōtorohanga: Kahotea marae
 1 marae in Te Kuiti: Te Tokanganui a Noho

Ngāti Tiipa and Ngāti Āmaru
The hāpu of Ngāti Tiipa and Ngāti Āmaru are associated with 6 marae:

 2 marae in Tuakau: Ngā Tai e Rua marae and Tauranganui marae
 4 marae at Port Waikato: Pakau marae, Te Awamārahi marae, Te Kotahitanga marae and Tikirahi marae

Ngāti Hauā
The hāpu of Ngāti Hauā is associated with 5 marae:

 3 marae in and around Morrinsville: Kai a Te Mata marae, Raungaiti mare and Rukumoana marae
 2 marae in Hamilton: Te Iti a Hauā (Tauwhare) marae and Waimakariri marae

Ngāti Korokī and Ngāti Raukawa
The hapū of Ngāti Korokī and Ngāti Raukawa are associated with 5 marae:

 2 marae south-east of Te Awamutu: Rāwhitiroa (Ōwairaka) marae in Parawera and Aotearoa marae in Wharepapa South
 2 marae near Lake Karapiro: Maungatautari	marae in Maungatautari and Pōhara marae in Arapuni
 1 marae near Tokoroa: Ngātira marae in Kinleith

Ngāti Māhanga and Ngāti Tamainupō
The hapū of Ngāti Māhanga and Ngāti Tamainupō are associated with 4 marae:

 2 marae around Raglan Harbour: Te Kaharoa (Aramiro) in Raglan and Waingaro marae in Waingaro
 2 marae near Whatawhata: Ōmaero marae and Te Papa o Rotu (Te Oneparepare) marae

Ngāi Tai, Ngāti Koheriki, and Ngāti Tamaoho
The hapū of Ngāi Tai, Ngāti Koheriki, and Ngāti Tamaoho are associated with 4 marae:

 Marae Kirikiri marae in Pōkeno
 Ngā Hau e Whā	marae in Pukekohe
 Umupuia marae in Clevedon
 Whātāpaka marae in Karaka

Ngāti Hine, Ngāti Naho and Ngāti Pou
The hapū of Ngāti Hine, Ngāti Naho and Ngāti Pou are associated with 4 marae:

 1 marae at Te Kauwhata: Waikare marae
 1 marae at Rangiriri: Horahora marae
 2 marae south of Lake Wairere: Maurea marae at Te Ōhakī and Matahuru Papakainga marae at Ohinewai

Ngāti Te Ata and Ngāti Paretaua
The hapū of Ngāti Te Ata and Ngāti Paretaua are associated with 4 marae:

 2 marae in Waiuku: Reretēwhioi marae and Tāhuna marae

Ngāti Taratikitiki
The hapū of Ngāti Te Ata and Ngāti Paretaua are associated with 4 marae:

 1 marae in Te Kauwhata: Waikare marae
 1 marae in Rangiriri: Horahora marae
 2 marae east of Huntly: Maurea marae and Te Poho o Tanikena marae

Ngāti Makirangi
The hapū of Ngāti Makirangi has no marae of its own, but is associated with 4 marae:

 2 marae near Taupiri: Hukanui marae and Tauhei marae
 1 marae near Rangiriri: Waiti (Raungaunu) marae
 1 marae near Tahuna: Hoe o Tainui marae

Ngāti Wairere

The hapū of Ngāti Wairere is associated with 2 marae:

 Hukanui marae east of Taupiri
 Tauhei marae north of Rototuna

Other hapū

 Ngāti Ngutu, based at Mangatoatoa marae in Te Awamutu and Rākaunui marae near Kawhia
 Ngāti Paretekawa, based at Mangatoatoa marae in Te Awamutu and Rākaunui marae in Hauturu
 Ngāti Pātupō	
 Ngāti Puhiawe, based at Waipapa marae in Kawhia
 Ngāti Ruru, based at Pārāwera	marae near Te Awamutu
 Ngāti Werokoko, based at Pārāwera marae near Te Awamutu
 Te Ākitai Waiohua, based at Makaurau marae in Mangere

References

External links
Official website of Waikato Tainui
Official site of Tainui Group Holdings, the tribe's commercial arm

 
Iwi and hapū